Viktorija Faith (born 26 October 1986) is a Lithuanian singer and actress who contested to represent Lithuania in the Eurovision Song Contest 2022 with her song "Walk Through The Water".

Life and career

Early life and education 
Viktorija Faith was born and raised in Vilnius, the capital of Lithuania. Her first debut was at the age of 7 years old, where she performed in theatre, television and small independent plays. From 1995 to 2001, she attended the Classical Music School in Karoliniškės,Vilnius, where she trained as a classical pianist along with pop singing, acting and dance training. 
She graduated from the University of West London. She furthered her studies in American Academy of Dramatic Arts, Los Angeles, United States.

Career beginnings 
Her debut song "The One" was a collaboration with Arif Ressmann and released in 2014 by Panache records. It reached the #4 spot on the Power Hit Radio Top 20 Charts in Lithuania. Faith won 1st place (professional singers category) in the Stars of Albion competition in 2016.

In 2022, she attempted to compete in the Eurovision Song Contest with her song "Walk Through The Water". She attempts to compete again in 2023 with her song "If You Ever Miss Me".

Influences 
Her soulful sound was influenced by Frank Ocean and Drake.

Discography

Singles

References

External links

1986 births
Living people
21st-century Lithuanian women singers
Lithuanian pop singers
Musicians from Vilnius